Live in Action  is the fifth album and first live album by the American hard rock band Starz. The album contains live recordings from 1977 and 1978 and was released by Metal Blade Records in 1989.

Track listing

Personnel
Starz
Michael Lee Smith - vocals
Richie Ranno - guitar
Brendan Harkin - guitar
Pieter "Pete" Sweval - bass
Joe X. Dube - drums

References

External links
Official band website
Interview with Richie Ranno
Interview with Starz guitarist Richie Ranno

1989 live albums
Starz (band) albums
Metal Blade Records live albums